or  is a title in Ottoman Empire hierarchy. Depending on the suffix or prefix it had different meanings. The English language translation of the word is a treasurer.

Treasurer 

Kalfa is Turkish for 'apprentice'.  was the title of the chief eunuch treasurer.

Lord (housemistress) of the sultan's palace and harem 

Only the first  could approach the sultan and other nobility, while the second, third and other s served the first .

References 

Ottoman titles
Civil servants from the Ottoman Empire